Leonardoxa africana is a tropical tree endemic to west Central Africa and Southeastern Nigeria. It is divided into four sub-species, of which three are myrmecophytes.

Subspecies 

 Leonardoxa africana subsp. africana
 Leonardoxa africana subsp. gracilicaulis McKey
 Leonardoxa africana subsp. letouzeyi McKey
 Leonardoxa africana subsp. rumpiensis McKey

Description 
The species grows to a height of between 4-14m tall, its diameter can reach a width of 45 cm but commonly less than 40 cm. Leaves have a pinnately compound arrangement, with 2-4 pairs of leaflets per pinnae but commonly 3 pairs per pinnae; leaflets have a falcate to elliptic shape. Inflorescence is raceme type, 40-60 flowered, position is commonly cauliflorous or ramiflorous, borne on main trunks or twigs but occasionally axillary on young twigs. Pedicel is 2-4 mm long, Calyx is green or red, sepals 0.5-0.8 cm long, petals are commonly violet, pink, mauve, or purple colored.

Distribu 
An under-storey tree, it grows near seasonally inundated regions and on dense sands in freshwater rainforest regions of Central Africa.

Ecology 
The ant species', Petalomyrmex phylax, Aphomomyrmex afer and Cataulacus mckeyi occupy swollen internodes or domatia of most subspecies of Leonardoxa africana and they feed on the nectaries usually at the base of leaflets and close to the midrib. Petalomyrmex phylax occupy young internodes while Cataulacus mckeyi and Aphomomyrmex afer patrols the basal parts of mature leaves.

Chemistry 
Methyl salicylate and hexanones have been identified as two compounds in young and mature leaves of the species.

References

Flora of Cameroon
Flora of Equatorial Guinea
Detarioideae
Taxa named by André Aubréville
Taxa named by Henri Ernest Baillon